Prix d'Été (English: Summer Classic) is a horse racing event for four-year-old Standardbred pacers held annually in Canada, at Hippodrome 3R of Trois-Rivières, Quebec.

History 
This event was held for the first time in 1966 under the name of Prix d'Automne (Autumn Classic) at the now defunct Blue Bonnets Raceway in Montreal. Run over a distance of one mile on a 5/8 mile oval track, the race was open to pacers age four and older. A $50,000 purse made it the richest harness race at that time in Canadian history. In 1967 the race was renamed the L'Amble du Centenaire (Centennial Pace) in honor of Canada's 100th anniversary and made open to pacers age three and older. In 1968 it became the Prix d'Été and in 1971 was modified to a stake race for three-year-old pacers.

Cancellation and Revival
The Prix d'Été was one of the top harness races in North America until 1992. The 1993 edition had to be cancelled due to a five-month strike action by horsemen. Deemed as no longer viable, the owners decided to close the track but in 1995 a municipal government corporation, Le Société d'habitation et de développement de Montréal (SHDM), purchased the track and renamed it Hippodrome de Montréal. Taken over and operated by the provincial government agency SONACC (Société nationale du cheval de course), but eventually withdrew its support and placed their operating company under bankruptcy protection on October 13, 2009, and permanently closed the facility.

The Prix d'Été was not held again until being revived in 2014 at Hippodrome 3R in Trois-Rivières as a race for four-year-olds. With a purse of $500,000 in 2019, it became the most remunerative race in North America for four-year-old pacers.

Records
Most wins by a driver:
 2 - Keith Waples (1972, 1975)
 2 - Michel Lachance (1988, 1989)
 2 - Yannick Gingras (2014, 2016)

Most wins by a trainer:
 6 – Billy Haughton (1967, 1970, 1974)

Stakes record:
 1:50 3/5 – Sunfire Blue Chip (2014) & All Bets Off (2015)

Prix d'Été winners

References

External links

Recurring sporting events established in 1966
Harness races in Canada
1966 establishments in Quebec
Sport in Montreal
Sport in Trois-Rivières